The Crusades were a series of religious wars sanctioned by the Latin Church in the medieval period. Crusading movement is about the ideology and institutions associated with crusading.

Crusade or Crusades may also refer to:

Arts and entertainment

Comics 
 Crusade, a Franco-Belgian comics series published by Le Lombard
 The Crusades (comics), a series of American comic books
 Crusade Comics, publisher founded by Billy Tucci

Films 
 The Crusaders (1918 film), an Italian film
 The Crusaders (2001 film), an Italian television mini-series
 The Crusades (film), a 1935 film directed by Cecil B. DeMille
 The Crusade (2021 film), a French drama film

Games 
 Darkness Falls: The Crusade, a 1999 internet MUD
 Great Crusade, an episode in Warhammer 40,000 fictional history
 Knights of the Temple: Infernal Crusade, a 2004 videogame
 Space Crusade, a boardgame set in the Warhammer 40,000 universe
 Warhammer 40,000: Dawn of War – Dark Crusade, a computer game expansion pack
 Wing Commander: The Secret Missions 2: Crusade, a computer game expansion pack
 World of Warcraft: The Burning Crusade, a 2007 computer game expansion pack

Literature
 Crusade (Destroyermen novel), the second book of the Destroyermen series
 Crusade (Forgotten Realms novel), a novel by James Lowder
 Crusade (Laird novel), a 2007 historical novel by Elizabeth Laird
 Crusade (short story), a 1968 Arthur C. Clarke short story
 Crusade (Young novel), a 2007 novel by Robyn Young
 Crusade, a 2003 novel from the Aquasilva Trilogy, by Anselm Audley
 Crusade, a young-adult series by Nancy Holder and Debbie Viguié
 Crusade, a 1992 Starfire novel by David Weber and Steve White
 Crusade, The Untold Story of the Persian Gulf War (1993), Rick Atkinson's non-fictional account of the 1990–1991 Persian Gulf War 
 The Crusade, novelization of the TV serial Doctor Who

Music 
 Crusade Records, an independent record label based in Sydney, Australia
 "Crusades", a song by August Burns Red from their 2009 album Constellations
 "The Crusade", a song by Lovebites from their 2018 EP Battle Against Damnation
 "The Crusaders", a Jazz Fusion Group

Albums
 Crusade (album), a 1967 album by John Mayall and the Bluesbreakers
 Crusades (album), an album by The Plastic Constellations
 The Crusade (album), a 2006 album by Trivium

Television 
 "Crusade" (Stargate SG-1), an episode from the science fiction TV series
 Crusade (TV series), a short-lived 1999 American science fiction spinoff from Babylon 5
 Crusader (TV series), an American drama series from 1955 to 1956, starring Brian Keith
 Crusades (TV series), a British television series hosted by Terry Jones
 The Crusade (Doctor Who), four episode serial from Doctor Who
 WHAS Crusade for Children, an annual telethon broadcast in Louisville, Kentucky

Events and movements
 Children's Crusade (1963),  a 1963 Civil Rights march in Alabama
 Children's Crusade, a failed popular crusade by European Christians to regain the Holy Land from the Muslims, said to have taken place in 1212

Organizations
 Campus Crusade for Christ, the former name of Cru, an American interdenominational Christian mission organization
 Crusade of Romanianism, a Romanian fascist party

Other uses
 Crusade (horse), an American-bred, Irish-trained Thoroughbred racehorse

See also 

 
 
 Crusader (disambiguation)
 Holy War (disambiguation)
 Jihad (disambiguation)
 Religious conflict (disambiguation)
 Sacred War (disambiguation)
 War of Religion (disambiguation)